The Race of the Century is the name of four famous races:
Race of the Century (auto racing), the 1953 French Grand Prix between Mike Hawthorn and Juan Manuel Fangio
Race of the Century (athletics), the 1954 British Empire Games, mile race between Roger Bannister and John Landy
Race of the Century (horse racing), the 1986 Cox Plate race involving Waverley Star and Bonecrusher
Race of the Century (swimming), the 2004 Athens Olympic Games Men's 200m Freestyle Final, involving Ian Thorpe, Pieter van den Hoogenband, Grant Hackett and Michael Phelps
and a film:
Race of the Century (film), a 1986 film which gives a dramatic presentation of the events of the Sunday Times Golden Globe Race